Shenzhen Polytechnic (SZPT) is a municipal public vocational college in Nanshan, Shenzhen, Guangdong, China. The institution is funded by the City of Shenzhen. 

Founded in 1993, the institution has four campuses (namely East, West, North and OCT). It has 21,000 full-time and 6,000 part-time students enrolled.

Overview

Shenzhen Polytechnic is a senior academy offering full-time courses, focusing on production, construction, management and services. It has four campuses - East Campus, West Campus, North Campus, and the Overseas Chinese Town Campus - which together occupy an area of 168 hectares, 49 hectares of which are buildings. These buildings house libraries with 1.34 million books, laboratory complexes, and other facilities. Shenzhen Polytechnic’s Industrial Training Center, for example, includes 28 training laboratories and 116 branch laboratories. In addition, the Polytechnic operates 330 off-campus practice bases.

In 2001 the polytechnic received the First Prize of National Educational Achievement. In January 2003, the polytechnic was designated a key national vocational and technical college. In September 2003 it was the sole recipient of an “A+” in each of 15 indexes of education in a nationwide evaluation of vocational and technical colleges and, for this achievement, was granted the title of “ Fine College ”.

In 2005 it received the First Prize of National Educational Achievement, for the second time, for which the Polytechnic was selected a National Model Vocational College by the Ministry of Education, and was recognized, nationwide, as a pioneer college.

Shenzhen Polytechnic employs 1,775 staff. These staff includes 1047 teachers, of whom more than 80% are "dual-skilled”. There are over 20,000 full-time students and about 5,000 part-time students. These students follow a range of training courses and are granted technical certificates upon graduation. In recent years, the employment ‘take-up’ rate has also been above 95%. In addition, 53 students and staff members have been awarded the CCIE (Cisco Certified Internetwork Expert) certificate, one of the world’s leading awards in the area of internet studies.

Within Shenzhen Polytechnic, there are 13 schools which cater to 92 specialties. These are: The School of Electronics and Information Engineering; The School of Mechanical and Electronic Engineering; The School of Media and Communication; The School of Economics and Management; The School of Art and Design; The School of Animation; The School of Applied Chemistry and Biological Technology; The School of Automotive and Transportation Engineering; The School of Construction and Environmental Engineering; The School of Applied Foreign Languages; The School of Nursing and Medical Technology; The School of Further Education; and, finally, The School of Training.

With the support of the Ministry of Education, the Computer-Aided Design course, the Electronics and Information Engineering course, and the Intelligent Building Engineering Technology course are 4-year programs. Each specialty has three or more off-campus practice bases and is overseen by a Specialty Management Committee. The total of 80 Specialty Management Committees have established close relations with 1000 or more enterprises and companies in Shenzhen.

The School of Training provides training bases at the national, regional and local level. At the national level it provides China’s National Highly Skilled Professionals Training Base, China’s National Teacher Training Base for Higher Vocational Education, and China’s National Occupational Skill Testing Organization. At the regional level the School of Training provides Guangdong Province with its Highly Skilled Professionals Training Base. And at the local level, the school provides the Municipality of Shenzhen with its Highly Skilled Professionals Training Base and its Reemployment Training Base for the Unemployed.

In total, the School of Training offers more than 290 vocational skill training and vocational qualification certification training programs. It is authorized to test more than 100 different types of work at technician, primary, intermediate, and advanced levels as well as vocational skills.

The polytechnic has six programs of natural science research registered and funded at the national level, and in the Tenth Five Year, Plan is ranked 15th for research amongst colleges in Guangdong Province. In recent years, it has published 2200 academic papers on natural sciences, more than 3400 papers on social sciences and 400 textbooks on higher vocational and technical education. The polytechnic was ranked first among China’s vocational colleges in 2004 and 2005.

The polytechnic has cooperative relationships with 40 universities and educational organizations outside of mainland China. These include universities and academic institutes in Brazil, Britain, Germany, France, Australia, the United States, Japan, South Korea, Hong Kong, and Taiwan. Seven foreign languages, including English, French, German, Japanese, Korean, Russian and Spanish, are taught on campus. And since 1998, for purposes of educational and cultural exchange and cooperation, it has received 30,000 visitors from other universities and educational organizations at home and abroad.

The polytechnic enjoys the attention and support of leaders, not only of Guangdong Province and Shenzhen Municipal Government but also of the Chinese central government. On September 12, 2005, Premier Wen Jiabao paid a visit. In 1997 and 1998, the former Vice Premier Li Lanqing toured the campus and left written words of encouragement and appreciation. Other leaders visiting campus have included Ms. Chen Zhili, Member of the State Committee, Zhang Dejiang, Secretary of Guangdong Province CPC, and Zhou Ji, Minister of the Ministry of Education.

Faculty departmental structure
International Office and International Education Department (IO & IED)
School of Electronic and Communication Engineering (SECE)
School of Mechanical and Electrical Engineering (SMEE)
School of Computer Engineering (SCE)
School of Economics (SE)
School of Management (SM)
School of Media and Communication (SMC)
School of Art and Design (SAD)
School of Applied Foreign Languages (SAFL)
School of Applied Chemistry and Biological Technology (SACBT)
School of Construction and Environment Engineering (SCEE)
School of Animation (SA)
School of Automotive and Transportation Engineering (SATE)
School of Medical Technology and Nursing (SMTN)
School of Continuing Education and Training (SCET)
School of Humanities (SH)
Department of Physical Education (DPE)
Branch School of OCT Campus (BS OCTC)

Schools and departments
The International Office & the International Education Department; The School of Electronics & Information Engineering; The School of Mechanical & Electrical Engineering; The School of Economics & Management; The School of Media & Communication; The School of Art & Design; The School of Applied Foreign Languages; The School of Applied Chemistry & Biological Technology; The School of Construction & Environment Engineering; The School of Animation; The School of Automotive & Transportation Engineering; The School of Medical Technology & Nursing; The School of Continuing Education & Training; The School of Humanities; The Department of Physical Education; The Branch School of the OCT Campus

Chinese language programs
 Elementary Chinese Program is designed for beginning learners with no or little Chinese learning experience. The program provides training in Chinese pronunciation and intonation, a volume of 2500-3000 Chinese words, and a set of basic Chinese phrases and grammatical structures. The training enables the learners to have a mastery of basic communicative ability to live in Chinese speaking environments, with a Chinese linguistic level equivalent to HSK Elementary level.
 Intermediate Chinese Program (1)(2) are designed for those wishing to improve mandarin Chinese with certain Chinese learning experiences and limited speaking competence. The program provides training in pronunciation and intonation improvement, a volume of 4000-5000 Chinese words, and a set of complicated Chinese phrases and grammatical structures. The training enables the learners to have a mastery of Chinese discourse interpretation ability to live and study in Chinese speaking environments, with an intermediate Chinese language level equivalent to HSK Intermediate level.
 Advanced Chinese Program is designed for those wishing to enlarge the Chinese characters volume and enrich their linguistic ability in order to communicate fluently and appropriately in a Chinese-speaking environment. The program provides training in pronunciation and intonation improvement, a volume of 6000-8000 Chinese words, a set of more complicated Chinese phrases and grammatical structures. The training enables the learners to express fluently and appropriately in academic or professional areas at normal speed, with a Chinese linguistic level equivalent to HSK Intermediate level.

Vocational skill training
The training is designed for career preparation by Shenzhen Polytechnic Vocational Training Center.

Diploma course studies
Shenzhen Polytechnic offers over 90 specialties in career preparation.

References

External links 

 Official site (English)
 Official site 

Universities and colleges in Shenzhen
Educational institutions established in 1993
1993 establishments in China